PTEN-induced kinase 1 (PINK1) is a mitochondrial serine/threonine-protein kinase encoded by the PINK1 gene.

It is thought to protect cells from stress-induced mitochondrial dysfunction. PINK1 activity causes the parkin protein to bind to depolarized mitochondria to induce autophagy of those mitochondria.  PINK1 is processed by healthy mitochondria and released to trigger neuron differentiation. Mutations in this gene cause one form of autosomal recessive early-onset Parkinson's disease.

Structure 
PINK1 is synthesized as a 63000 Da protein which is often cleaved by PARL, between the 103-Alanine and the 104-Phenylalanine residues, into a 53000 Da fragment. PINK1 contains an N-terminal mitochondrial localization sequence, a putative transmembrane sequence, a Ser/Thr kinase domain, and a C-terminal regulatory sequence. The protein has been found to localize to the outer membrane of mitochondria, but can also be found throughout the cytosol. Experiments suggest the Ser/Thr kinase domain faces outward toward the cytosol, indicating a possible point of interaction with parkin.

The structure of PINK1 has been solved and shows how the protein binds and phosphorylates its substrate ubiquitin.

Function 
PINK1 is intimately involved with mitochondrial quality control by identifying damaged mitochondria and targeting specific mitochondria for degradation. Healthy mitochondria maintain a membrane potential that can be used to import PINK1 into the inner membrane where it is cleaved by PARL and cleared from the outer membrane. Severely damaged mitochondria lack sufficient membrane potential to import PINK1, which then accumulates on the outer membrane. PINK1 then recruits parkin to target the damaged mitochondria for degradation through autophagy.  Due to the presence of PINK1 throughout the cytoplasm, it has been suggested that PINK1 functions as a "scout" to probe for damaged mitochondria.

PINK1 may also control mitochondria quality through mitochondrial fission. Through mitochondrial fission, a number of daughter mitochondria are created, often with an uneven distribution in membrane potential. Mitochondria with a strong, healthy membrane potential were more likely to undergo fusion than mitochondria with low membrane potential. Interference with the mitochondrial fission pathway led to an increase in oxidized proteins and a decrease in respiration. Without PINK1, parkin cannot efficiently localize to damaged mitochondria, while an over-expression of PINK1 causes parkin to localize to even healthy mitochondria.  Furthermore, mutations in both Drp1, a mitochondrial fission factor, and PINK1 were fatal in Drosophila models. However, an over-expression of Drp1 could rescue subjects deficient in PINK1 or parkin, suggesting mitochondrial fission initiated by Drp1 recreates the same effects of the PINK1/parkin pathway.

In addition to mitochondrial fission, PINK1 has been implicated in mitochondrial motility. The accumulation of PINK1 and recruitment of parkin targets a mitochondrion for degradation, and PINK1 may serve to enhance degradation rates by arresting mitochondrial motility. Over-expression of PINK1 produced similar effects to silencing Miro, a protein closely associated with mitochondrial migration.

Another mechanism of mitochondrial quality control may arise through mitochondria-derived vesicles. Oxidative stress in mitochondria can produce potentially harmful compounds including improperly folded proteins or reactive oxygen species. PINK1 has been shown to facilitate the creation of mitochondria-derived vesicles which can separate reactive oxygen species and shuttle them toward lysosomes for degradation.

Disease relevance 
Parkinson's disease is often characterized by the degeneration of dopaminergic neurons and associated with the build-up of improperly folded proteins and Lewy bodies. Mutations in the PINK1 protein have been shown to lead to a build-up of such improperly folded proteins in the mitochondria of both fly and human cells. Specifically, mutations in the serine/threonine kinase domain have been found in a number of Parkinson's patients where PINK1 fails to protect against stress-induced mitochondrial dysfunction and apoptosis.

Pharmacological manipulation 
To date, there have been few reports of small molecules that activate PINK1 and their promise as potential treatments for Parkinson's disease. The first report appeared in 2013 when Kevan Shokat and his team from UCSF identified a nucleobase called kinetin as an activator of PINK1. Subsequently, it was shown by others that the nucleoside derivative of kinetin, i.e. kinetin riboside, exhibited significant activation of PINK1 in cells. Additionally, the monophosphate prodrugs of kinetin riboside, ProTides, also showed activation of PINK1. In December 2017, niclosamide, an anthelmintic drug, was identified as a potent activator of PINK1 in cells and in neurons.

References

Further reading

External links 
  GeneReviews/NCBI/NIH/UW entry on PINK1 Type of Young-Onset Parkinson Disease